The 2022 United States House of Representatives elections in New York were held on November 8, 2022, to elect the 26 U.S. representatives from the State of New York, one from each of the state's 26 congressional districts. The elections coincided with elections for governor, U.S. Senate, attorney general, comptroller, state senate, and assembly, and various other state and local elections.

Following the 2020 Census, New York lost one seat in the U.S. House. Incumbent representatives Lee Zeldin (R), Thomas Suozzi (D), Kathleen Rice (D), John Katko (R), Chris Jacobs (R), and Joe Sempolinski (R) retired. Representatives Carolyn Maloney (D) and Mondaire Jones (D) lost renomination in their primary contests. The primary elections were set to happen on June 28, but due to a court-ordered redraw of the state's Congressional maps, they were held on August 23. Due in part to Kathy Hochul's relatively weak performance in the governor's race and heavily pro-Republican turnout bias, the Democratic Party lost four seats.

Overview

Votes by ballot line
In some races, candidates appeared on multiple ballot lines, with Democratic candidates often appearing on the Working Families line and Republican candidates often appearing on the Conservative line. However, they all caucus with either the Democrats or the Republicans.

Votes by district
Candidates on multiple ballot lines are marked as the party they caucus with.

Seat allocation
Votes are marked under party the candidate caucuses with, regardless of ballot line.

District 1

The 1st district is based on the eastern end and North Shore of Long Island, including the Hamptons, the North Fork, Riverhead, Port Jefferson, Smithtown, and Huntington, all in Suffolk County. Due to redistricting, the district lost most of Brookhaven to the 2nd district and picked up Huntington from the 3rd district. The district has a PVI of R+4 but voted for Joe Biden by 0.2 points in 2020. The incumbent is Republican Lee Zeldin, who was reelected with 54.8% of the vote in 2020. He is retiring to run for governor.

Republicans chose their nominee, Nick LaLota, to succeed Zeldin in a three-way primary in late August, the endorsed candidate of their county committee. The primary looked to be a race between him and Anthony Figliola, a former Brookhaven deputy supervisor who argued his independence from the county party leadership made him the better choice, until Michelle Bond, head of the Association for Digital Asset Marketing, a cryptocurrency trade group, who had been raised in the district but not lived there in a long time, filed petitions to run right before the deadline. Her campaign was well-funded by industry figures, particularly her boyfriend Ryan Salame, an executive with FTX.

Bond was widely perceived, according to LaLota, as trying to buy the seat on behalf of her industry. She raised $700,000 in contributions and loaned her campaign $900,000; this was augmented by super PACs funded by Salame and other crypto executives for a total of $3.5 million in spending. "This was a pure power play by the crypto industry looking to get a seat at the table on Wall Street", Figliola said later.

Among Bond's supporters, albeit discreetly, was George Santos, the endorsed Republican candidate in the neighboring 3rd district and the winner of the general election there, later found to have extensively misrepresented his personal background and history. His Leadership PAC, GADS PAC, contributed the maximum $5,800 to her campaign (which reports the donation as only $5,000), Santos's sister Tiffany also gave the same amount, and the two campaigns shared the services of a consulting firm founded by a couple very supportive of Santos. He never publicly endorsed Bond, but was often seen with her at events.

It is very unusual for a party's endorsed candidate to back a challenger to their party's endorsed candidate in another primary race, even to the limited extent Santos did. Jesse Garcia, the Suffolk County Republican chairman, said later he felt especially betrayed since he had diverted a possible primary challenger to Santos towards a run for the State Assembly at a time prior to the state's redistricting, when the 3rd district included some towns in Suffolk County and Santos had contributed to LaLota's campaign. "I believe he did things to ingratiate himself, for the sole purpose of advancing his personal career at the expense of other members on the ticket", he said in early 2023. LaLota said he was "more than annoy[ed]" at Santos for supporting Bond but decided against making an issue of it during the campaign; he was later one of the first Republicans in Congress to call for Santos to resign once his deceptions became known.

Ultimately LaLota won the primary with 47 percent of the vote. Bond finished with 28 percent to Figliola's 25 percent. The latter noted that he had raised and spent just $68,000; meaning she had spent 10 times as much as he had for all the votes he got.

Republican/Conservative nominee
Nick LaLota, former Suffolk County Board of Elections commissioner and chief of staff to Suffolk County legislator Kevin McCaffrey

Eliminated in primary 
Michelle Bond, businesswoman
Anthony Figliola, former deputy supervisor of Brookhaven

Withdrawn / Disqualified 

 Robert Cornicelli, veteran and supervisor of Department of Public Works inspectors in Oyster Bay (Running in New York's 2nd congressional district)
 Dean Gandley (endorsed LaLota)
 Edward Francis Moore Jr., businessman
 Cait Corrigan
 Patrick Hahn

Declined 
Lee Zeldin, incumbent U.S. Representative (ran for governor)

Endorsements

Primary results

Democratic/Working Families nominee
Bridget Fleming, member of the Suffolk County Legislature for the 2nd district and candidate for this district in 2020

Did not make the ballot 
 Alexandre Zajic

Withdrawn 
Nicholas Antonucci, educator and executive director of Sachem Professional Development, Inc.
John Atkinson (endorsed Hahn)
Kara Hahn, Deputy Presiding Officer of and member of the Suffolk County Legislature for the 5th district (endorsed Fleming)
Austin Smith, bankruptcy attorney

Endorsements

General election

Predictions

Results

District 2 

The 2nd district is based on the South Shore of Suffolk County, including the towns of Babylon, Islip, and most of Brookhaven all in Suffolk County, and a small part of Oyster Bay in Nassau County. Due to redistricting, the district lost portions of Nassau County and now stretches farther east along the South Shore. The district has a PVI of R+4 and voted for Donald Trump by 1.5 points in 2020. The incumbent is Republican Andrew Garbarino, who was elected with 52.9% of the vote in 2020.

Republican/Conservative nominee

Nominee 
Andrew Garbarino, incumbent U.S. representative

Eliminated in primary 
Robert Cornicelli, veteran of the U.S. Navy and U.S. Army National Guard, Town of Oyster Bay Sanitation Inspector Supervisor
Cait Corrigan, pastor
Mike Rakebrandt, combat veteran and NYPD Detective

Endorsements

Primary results

Democratic nominee
Jackie Gordon, Babylon town councilwoman, U.S. Army veteran, and Democratic nominee for the 2nd district in 2020 (previously filed to run in the 1st district)

Endorsements

General election

Predictions

Polling

Results

District 3

The 3rd district is based on the North Shore of Nassau County, including all of the towns of North Hempstead and Glen Cove, most of the town of Oyster Bay, and a small part of Hempstead, and parts of Northeast Queens, including the neighborhoods of Whitestone, Beechhurst, Little Neck, and Douglaston. Due to redistricting, the district lost Huntington to the 1st district. It has a PVI of D+2 and voted for Joe Biden by 8 points in 2020. The incumbent is Democrat Thomas Suozzi, who was reelected with 55.9% of the vote in 2020. Suozzi declined to run for reelection, instead opting to run for governor.

In the general election, Republican George Santos defeated Democrat Robert Zimmerman by 8 points, considered an upset in this Democratic-leaning district. On December 19, 2022, The New York Times published an article reporting that Santos had allegedly misrepresented many aspects of his life and career, including his education and employment history. An attorney for Santos said the report was a "smear" and "defamatory" but did not address the report's substance. Santos did not produce any documents to substantiate his claims, despite several requests from the Times to do so. Other news organizations confirmed and elaborated on the Timess reporting. Gerard Kassar, chair of the Conservative Party of New York State, said: "I've never seen anything like this. His entire life seems to be made up. Everything about him is fraudulent."

In the wake of the disclosures about Santos, commentators expressed amazement that no one, save the local North Shore Leader and opposition research by the Democratic Congressional Campaign Committee, had raised questions about Santos's background during the campaign. It was speculated that if what the Times reported had been public knowledge before the election, Santos would have lost. But FiveThirtyEight said that was "unclear", noting that the other two Republican candidates on the ballot districtwide, Lee Zeldin and Joe Pinion, had also carried it. Zeldin's 12 percent margin of victory in the state's gubernatorial race exceeded Santos's, and Pinion's 4 percent margin was impressive given that his campaign for U.S. Senate against Democratic majority leader Chuck Schumer was minimally funded. The site has found that pre-election scandals have on average cost candidates about 9 percent of the vote that they might otherwise have received, and while that might have been enough to throw the election to Zimmerman, "a scandal's impact varies quite a bit from election to election. So we can't just subtract 9 points from that margin and assume that would have been the result if voters had been aware of his deceptions." Nathaniel Rakich observed that "in this era of high partisan polarization, scandals may hurt candidates less than they used to."

Democratic nominee

Robert Zimmerman, Democratic National Committee member and communications professional

Eliminated in primary 
 Melanie D'Arrigo, health care consultant and candidate for this district in 2020
Jon Kaiman, former supervisor of the town of North Hempstead and former chairman of the Nassau Interim Finance Authority
Josh Lafazan, Nassau County Legislator for the 18th district
Reema Rasool, candidate for Oyster Bay Town Council in 2021

Withdrawn 
 Alessandra Biaggi, State Senator from the 34th district (2019–present) (running in the 17th district)

Declined 
Thomas Suozzi, incumbent U.S. representative (ran unsuccessfully for Democratic nomination for governor of New York)

Endorsements

Polling

Primary results

Republican primary

Nominee
George Santos, Former Call Center Employee, and nominee for this district in 2020

Endorsements

General election

Predictions

Polling

Josh Lafazan vs. George Santos vs. Melanie D'Arrigo

Endorsements

Results

District 4

The 4th district is based on the South Shore of Nassau County and is entirely within the town of Hempstead. The district was mostly unchanged by redistricting. It has a PVI of D+5 and voted for Joe Biden by 15 points in 2020. The incumbent is Democrat Kathleen Rice, who was reelected with 56.1% of the vote in 2020. On February 15, 2022, Rice announced that she will retire at the end of her term.

Democratic primary

Candidates

Nominee 
 Laura Gillen, former town supervisor of Hempstead (2018–2019)

Eliminated in primary 
Muzibul Huq, physician and surgeon
 Carrié Solages, Member of the Nassau County Legislature (2004–present)
 Keith Corbett, Mayor of Malverne

Did not make the ballot
Jason Abelove, former Democratic candidate for Hempstead Town Supervisor (2021)
 Kevin Shakil, Founder of America's Islamic Radio

Withdrawn
 Siela Bynoe, Member of the Nassau County Legislature

Declined
Todd Kaminsky, New York State Senator from the 9th district (2016–present), former New York State Assemblymember from the 20th district (2015–2016), candidate for Nassau County District Attorney in 2021
Kathleen Rice, incumbent U.S. Representative (endorsed Gillen)

Endorsements

Polling

Primary results

Republican/Conservative nominee
 Anthony D'Esposito, retired NYPD detective and Hempstead Town Board member

Disqualified
 Bill Staniford, veteran and CEO of PropertyShark

Endorsements

General election

Predictions

Polling

Generic Democrat vs. generic Republican

Results

District 5

The 5th district is based in Southeast Queens, including the neighborhoods of Jamaica, Hollis, Laurelton, Richmond Hill, Ozone Park, Howard Beach, and the Rockaways. The district was mostly unchanged by redistricting. It has a PVI of D+32 and voted for Joe Biden by 63 points in 2020. The incumbent is Democrat Gregory Meeks, who was reelected unopposed with 99.3% of the vote in 2020.

Democratic nominee
Gregory Meeks, incumbent U.S. Representative

Withdrawn 
Frankie Lozada

Endorsements

Republican nominee
Paul King, businessman

Endorsements

General election

Predictions

Results

District 6

The 6th district is based in Central and Eastern Queens, including the neighborhoods of Woodside, Jackson Heights, Elmhurst, Kew Gardens, Flushing, Bayside, and Fresh Meadows. The district was mostly unchanged by redistricting. It has a PVI of D+17 and voted for Joe Biden by 31 points in 2020. The incumbent is Democrat Grace Meng, who was reelected with 67.9% of the vote in 2020.

Democratic Nominee
Grace Meng, incumbent U.S. Representative

Endorsements

Republican nominee
Tom Zmich, U.S. Army veteran, nominee for Queens Borough President in 2021, nominee for this district in 2020

General election

Predictions

Results

District 7

The 7th district is based in parts of Brooklyn and Queens, including the neighborhoods of Clinton Hill, Williamsburg, Greenpoint, Bushwick, Woodhaven, Fresh Pond, Maspeth, Sunnyside, and Long Island City. The seat was significantly altered due to redistricting, losing all of its previous territory in Manhattan and South Brooklyn in exchange for parts of Queens formerly in the 12th district. The district has a PVI of D+32 and voted for Joe Biden by 60 points in 2020. The incumbent is Democrat Nydia Velázquez, who was re-elected with 84.8% of the vote in 2020.

Democratic primary
Nominal challenger Paperboy Prince became notable for both their flamboyant 2021 run for New York City Mayor, and their attempt to get on the ballots in 11 congressional districts simultaneously. They only succeeded in this one.

Candidates

Nominee 
Nydia Velázquez, incumbent U.S. Representative

Eliminated in primary
Paperboy Prince, artist and community activist

Endorsements

Primary results

Republican/Conservative nominee
Juan Pagan

Endorsements

General election

Predictions

Results

District 8

The 8th district is based in Southern and Eastern Brooklyn, including the neighborhoods of Bed-Stuy, Brownsville, East New York, Canarsie, Bergen Beach, Sheepshead Bay, Gravesend, and Coney Island. The district was mostly unchanged by redistricting. It has a PVI of D+25 and voted for Joe Biden by 49 points in 2020. The incumbent is Democrat Hakeem Jeffries, who was reelected with 84.8% of the vote in 2020.

Democratic primary

Candidates

Nominee 
Hakeem Jeffries, incumbent U.S. Representative and Chair of the House Democratic Caucus

Eliminated in primary 
 Queen Johnson, activist and nonprofit co-founder

Endorsements

Primary results

Republican nominee
Yuri Dashevsky

Forward Party
 Brian Mannix, social studies teacher

General election

Predictions

Results

District 9

The 9th district is based in South and Central Brooklyn, including the neighborhoods of Prospect Heights, Crown Heights, Midwood, and Borough Park. The district was mostly unchanged by redistricting. It has a PVI of D+27 and voted for Joe Biden by 52 points in 2020. The incumbent is Democrat Yvette Clarke, who was reelected with 83% of the vote in 2020.

Democratic nominee
Yvette Clarke, incumbent U.S. Representative

Endorsements

Disqualified
Isiah James, veteran, community organizer, and candidate for this seat in 2020

Republican primary

Disqualified
Menachem Raitport, nominee for Brooklyn Borough President in 2021

General election

Predictions

Results

District 10

The 10th district is based in Lower Manhattan and Brownstone Brooklyn, including the neighborhoods of Park Slope, Windsor Terrace, Gowanus, Brooklyn Heights, Cobble Hill, Red Hook, Sunset Park, the Lower East Side, Greenwich Village, and the Financial District. The district was significantly altered due to redistricting, resembling the previous 10th so little as to be a new seat. It has a PVI of D+36 and voted for Joe Biden by 71 points in 2020. There is no incumbent. Rep. Mondaire Jones, the incumbent from the Rockland and Westchester-based 17th district, lost to lawyer Dan Goldman in the Democratic primary.

Democratic primary
A last-minute, court-ordered redistricting on the district turning what was a nominal race between safe incumbent Jerry Nadler and two non-notable challengers, into a free for all of 13 candidates, several of whom were notable.

On the ballot

Nominee 
Dan Goldman, former assistant U.S. Attorney for the Southern District of New York (2007–2017), former general counsel for the U.S. House Intelligence Committee (2019–2020), candidate for Attorney General of New York in 2022

Eliminated in primary
Quanda Francis, data scientist
Peter Gleason
Elizabeth Holtzman, former New York City Comptroller (1990–1993), former Brooklyn District Attorney (1982–1989), former U.S. Representative from New York's 16th congressional district (1973–1981), nominee for U.S. Senate in 1980, candidate for U.S. Senate in 1992
Mondaire Jones, incumbent U.S. Representative from the New York's 17th congressional district
Jimmy Li, podiatrist, former member of Brooklyn Community Board 7, and former president of the New York City Asian-American Democratic Club
Maud Maron, lawyer
Yuh-Line Niou, New York State Assemblymember from the 65th district (2017–present)
Carlina Rivera, New York City Councilmember from the 2nd district (2018–present)
Brian Robinson, credit counselor
Jo Anne Simon, New York State Assemblymember from the 52nd district (2015–present), candidate for Brooklyn Borough President in 2021 (also running for reelection due to separate primary dates)
Yan Xiong, Pastor, U.S. Army veteran and dissident involved in the Tiananmen Square protests of 1989

Withdrawn
Bill de Blasio, former Mayor of New York City (2014–2021), former New York City Public Advocate (2010–2013), former New York City Councilmember from the 39th district (2002–2009)
Brad Hoylman, New York State Senator from the 27th district (2013–present) and candidate for Manhattan Borough President in 2021 (endorsed Goldman) (running for reelection)
Jerry Nadler, incumbent U.S. Representative (running in the 12th district)
Elizabeth Kim, business consulting associate
Ashmi Sheth, former Federal Reserve regulator (unsuccessfully ran in the 12th district)

Disqualified
Laura Thomas
John Herron

Declined
Robert Carroll, New York State Assemblymember from the 44th district (2017–present) (endorsed Goldman) (running for reelection)
Simcha Felder, New York State Senator from the 17th district (2013–present), former New York City Councilmember from the 44th district (2002–2010) (running for reelection)
Kathryn Garcia, director of New York state operations (2021–present), former Commissioner of the New York City Sanitation Department (2014–2018), candidate for Mayor of New York in 2021
Shahana Hanif, New York City Councilmember from the 39th district (2022–present) (endorsed Niou)
Corey Johnson, former Speaker of the New York City Council (2018–2021), former New York City Councilmember from the 3rd district (2014–2021), former acting New York City Public Advocate (2019), candidate for New York City Comptroller in 2021
Brad Lander, New York City Comptroller (2022–present), former New York City Councilmember from the 39th district (2010–2021)
Lincoln Restler, New York City Councilmember from the 33rd district (2022–present) (endorsed Rivera)
Max Rose, former U.S. Representative from the 11th district (2019–2021) (running in the 11th district)
Dawn Smalls, attorney and candidate for New York City Public Advocate in 2019
Scott Stringer, former New York City Comptroller (2014–2021), former Borough President of Manhattan (2006–2013), former New York State Assemblymember from the 67th district (1993–2005), candidate for Mayor of New York City in 2021
Nydia Velázquez, incumbent U.S. Representative from New York's 7th congressional district (endorsed Rivera) (running in the 7th district)
Brandon West, Office of Management and Budget worker, candidate for New York City's 39th City Council district in 2021
David Yassky, former Dean of Pace University School of Law (2014–2018), former New York City Councilmember from the 33rd district (2002–2009), candidate for New York's 11th congressional district in 2006, candidate for New York City Comptroller in 2009 (running for State Senate)

Endorsements

Polling
Graphical summary

Primary results

Republican/Conservative nominee
 Benine Hamdan, risk analyst

Working Families Party

Declined
Mondaire Jones, incumbent U.S. Representative from the 17th district (2021–present)
Yuh-Line Niou, New York State Assemblymember from the 65th district (2017–present)

General election

Predictions

Results

District 11

The 11th district includes all of Staten Island and the neighborhoods of Bay Ridge, Fort Hamilton, Dyker Heights, Bath Beach, and Bensonhurst in Brooklyn. The seat was mostly unchanged by redistricting. It has a PVI of R+5 and voted for Donald Trump by 8 points in 2020, making it the only Republican-leaning district in New York City. The incumbent is Republican Nicole Malliotakis, who was elected with 53.0% of the vote in 2020 over then-incumbent Max Rose, who ran again for his old seat, however lost by a landslide margin of 23.1%.

Republican/Conservative nominee
Nicole Malliotakis, incumbent U.S. Representative

Republican primary

Eliminated 
John Matland, former healthcare worker and activist

Endorsements

Primary results

Democratic primary

Candidates

Nominee 
Max Rose, former U.S. Representative for this district (2019–2021)

Eliminated in primary 
Komi Agoda-Koussema, educator
Brittany Ramos DeBarros, veteran and activist

Withdrawn
Mike DeCillis, retired police officer and candidate in the 2018 election (endorsed Max Rose)

Declined
Bill de Blasio, former Mayor of New York City (2014–2021), former New York City Public Advocate (2010–2013), former New York City Councilmember from the 39th district (2002–2009) (ran in the 10th district, then withdrew)
Justin Brannan, New York City Councilmember from the 43rd district (2018–present) (endorsed Rose)
Kathryn Garcia, director of New York state operations (2021–present), former Commissioner of the New York City Sanitation Department (2014–2018), candidate for Mayor of New York in 2021
Charles Fall, New York State Assemblymember from the 61st district (2019–present) (endorsed Rose, then rescinded endorsement)
Jumaane Williams, New York City Public Advocate (2019–present), former New York City Councilmember from the 45th district (2010–2019), candidate for Lieutenant Governor of New York in 2018 (running for Governor)

Endorsements

Primary results

General election

Predictions

Polling

Generic Republican vs. generic Democrat

Results

District 12

The 12th district is entirely based in Manhattan, comprising the Upper West Side, Upper East Side, Midtown, Hell's Kitchen, Chelsea, Murray Hill, and Gramercy. The district was significantly altered by redistricting, losing all previous territory in Queens and now including both the west and east sides of Manhattan. The district was altered so significantly in redistricting as to be a new seat, combining the Manhattan parts of the old 10th and 12th districts. The district has a PVI of D+35 and voted for Joe Biden by 71 points in 2020. The incumbents are Democrats Carolyn Maloney and Jerry Nadler. Maloney was reelected with 82.1% of the vote in 2020 (in the old 12th district), and Nadler was reelected with 74.5% of the vote in 2020 (in the old 10th district).

Nadler and Maloney both chose to run in the new 12th, and Nadler defeated Maloney in the Democratic primary.

This seat has the highest percentage of Jewish voters of any congressional district in the country.

Democratic primary

Nominee
Jerry Nadler, incumbent U.S. Representative from the 10th district (previously filed to run in the 10th district)

Eliminated in primary
Carolyn Maloney, incumbent U.S. Representative
Suraj Patel, attorney and candidate for the 12th district in 2018 and 2020
Ashmi Sheth, former Federal Reserve regulator

Withdrawn
Rana Abdelhamid, nonprofit founder and activist

Endorsements

Polling

Primary results

Republican/Conservative nominee
Michael Zumbluskas, New York City Department of Transportation employee and perennial candidate.

Independent candidate
Mikhail (Mike) Itkis, an amateur pornographer.

General election

Predictions

Results

District 13

The 13th district is based in Upper Manhattan and the Northwest Bronx, including the neighborhoods of Harlem, Morningside Heights, Spanish Harlem, Hamilton Heights, Washington Heights, Inwood, Marble Hill, Fordham, Kingsbridge, and Bedford Park. The seat was mostly unchanged by redistricting. It has a PVI of D+40, making it the nation's most Democratic-leaning district, and voted for Joe Biden by 78 points in 2020. The incumbent is Democrat Adriano Espaillat, who was reelected with 90.8% of the vote in 2020.

Democratic primary

Candidates

Nominee 
Adriano Espaillat, incumbent U.S. Representative

Eliminated in primary
Michael Hano, member of the Social Democrats of America
Francisco Spies

Endorsements

Primary results

Republican

Disqualified 
Gary Richards, business executive

General election

Predictions

Results
According to the Board of Elections, only Espaillat is on the ballot.

District 14

The 14th district is based in North Queens and the East Bronx, including the neighborhoods of Corona, East Elmhurst, Astoria, College Point, Hunts Point, Castle Hill, Throggs Neck, Parkchester, Middletown, Country Club, Co-Op City, and City Island. The district was mostly unchanged by redistricting. It has a PVI of D+30 and voted for Joe Biden by 58 points in 2020. The incumbent is Democrat Alexandria Ocasio-Cortez, who was reelected with 71.6% of the vote in 2020.

Democratic Nominee 
Alexandria Ocasio-Cortez, incumbent U.S. Representative

Endorsements

Republican primary

Candidates

Nominee 
Tina Forte, social media influencer

Eliminated in primary 
Desi Cuellar, former bartender

Endorsements

Primary results

Conservative nominee
 Desi Cuellar, former bartender

Libertarian nominee
Jonathan Howe, public defender

All Libertarians were disqualified for all races due to new ballot restrictions.

General election

Predictions

Results

District 15

The 15th district is based in the West Bronx, including the neighborhoods of Mott Haven, Melrose, Morrisania, Highbridge, Tremont, West Farms, Belmont, Norwood, Woodlawn, Riverdale, and Spuyten Duyvil. The district was mostly unchanged by redistricting, though it did add Riverdale and Spuyten Duyvil. The district has a PVI of D+37 and voted for Joe Biden by 70 points in 2020. The incumbent is Democrat Ritchie Torres, who was elected with 88.7% of the vote in 2020.

Democratic nominee
Ritchie Torres, incumbent U.S. Representative

Endorsements

Republican nominee
Stylo Sapaskis

General election

Predictions

Results

District 16

The 16th district is based in southern Westchester County, including Yonkers, White Plains, New Rochelle, and Rye. It also includes Wakefield in the Bronx. The district was mostly unchanged by redistricting, though it did lose Riverdale and Spuyten Devil to the 15th district. It has a PVI of D+21 and voted for Joe Biden by 44 points in 2020. The incumbent is Democrat Jamaal Bowman, who was elected with 84% of the vote in 2020.

Democratic primary

Nominee
Jamaal Bowman, incumbent U.S. Representative

Eliminated in primary 
Vedat Gashi, Westchester County legislator
Mark Jaffe, businessman
Catherine Parker, Westchester County legislator

Withdrew
Manuel Casanova, former political strategist (endorsed Gashi)
Michael Gerald, pastor

Endorsements

Primary results

Republican nominee
Miriam Flisser, former Mayor of Scarsdale (2011–2013)

General election

Predictions

Results

District 17

The 17th district is based in the Lower Hudson Valley, including all of Rockland and Putnam Counties, northern Westchester County, and a small part of Dutchess County. The district was significantly altered due to redistricting, now including all of northern Westchester and adding Putnam County and a small part of Dutchess County. The district has a PVI of D+3 and voted for Joe Biden by 10 points in 2020. The incumbent is Democrat Mondaire Jones, who announced on May 20 that he would instead run for reelection in the Lower Manhattan and Brooklyn-based 10th district. Sean Patrick Maloney, the Democratic incumbent of the neighboring 18th district and chair of the Democratic Congressional Campaign Committee, announced his intention to run in this seat. Jones had been elected to this seat with 59.3% of the vote in 2020, while Maloney had been reelected to the neighboring 18th district with 55.8% of the vote in 2020.

Maloney defeated state senator Alessandra Biaggi in the Democratic primary. Republican candidate Mike Lawler narrowly won the general election, with Maloney conceding.

Democratic primary

Nominee 
Sean Patrick Maloney, incumbent U.S. Representative from the 18th district and Chair of the Democratic Congressional Campaign Committee

Eliminated in primary 
 Alessandra Biaggi, State Senator from the 34th district (2019–present) (previously filed to run in the 3rd district)

Withdrawn
Mondaire Jones, incumbent U.S. Representative (running in the 10th district)

Endorsements

Polling

Primary results

Republican primary

Candidates

Nominee 
Mike Lawler, New York State Assemblymember from the 97th district (2021–present)

Eliminated in primary 
Shoshana M. David
Charles J. Falciglia
William G. Faulkner
Jack W. Schrepel

Primary results

Conservative primary

Candidates

Nominee 
Mike Lawler, New York State Assemblymember from the 97th district (2021–2022) (Republican)

Eliminated in primary
William G. Faulkner

Primary results

General election

Predictions

Polling

Alessandra Biaggi vs. Mike Lawler

Results

District 18

The 18th district is based in the mid Hudson Valley, including all of Orange County and most of Dutchess and Ulster Counties. The seat was modestly altered due to redistricting, losing all of Putnam County to the 17th district while picking up the portions of Dutchess and Ulster Counties formerly in the 19th district. The district has a PVI of D+1 and voted for Joe Biden by 8 points in 2020. The incumbents were Democrat Sean Patrick Maloney, who was reelected with 55.8% of the vote in 2020, and Democrat Pat Ryan, who was first elected in 2022 in a special election with 51.2% of the vote. Maloney ran for reelection in the neighboring 17th district instead, while Pat Ryan ran for reelection in this district. In the general election Pat Ryan narrowly beat Schmitt, with Schmitt conceding defeat.

Democratic primary

Nominee 
Pat Ryan, incumbent U.S. Representative from the 19th district

Eliminated in primary 
Aisha Mills, political strategist
Moses Mugulusi

Withdrawn 
Sean Patrick Maloney, incumbent U.S. Representative (running in the 17th district)

Declined 
James Skoufis, New York State Senator from the 39th district (2019–present), former New York State Assemblymember from the 99th district (2013–2018) (running for reelection)

Endorsements

Primary results

Republican nominee
Colin Schmitt, New York State Assembly member from the 99th district (2019–2022)

Endorsements

General election

Predictions

Polling

Sean Patrick Maloney vs. Colin Schmitt

Results

District 19

The 19th district stretches from the Upper Hudson Valley across the Catskill Mountains to parts of the Southern Tier and Finger Lakes, including Hudson, Woodstock, Monticello, Oneonta, Binghamton, and Ithaca. It includes all of Columbia, Greene, Sullivan, Delaware, Chenango, Cortland, Broome, Tioga, and Tompkins counties, and parts of Otsego and Ulster Counties. The district was modestly altered by redistricting, losing all of its territory in Dutchess County and most of its territory in Ulster County in exchange for Binghamton and Ithaca. The district has an even PVI and voted for Joe Biden by 5 points in 2020. The incumbent was Democrat Antonio Delgado, who was reelected with 54.8% of the vote in 2020. But on May 3, 2022, Governor Kathy Hochul announced her intention to appoint Delgado to the vacant lieutenant governor position, triggering a special election that Democrat Pat Ryan won with 51.2% of the vote. Ryan was then redistricted into the neighboring 18th district, leaving this seat open.

Democratic primary

Nominee 
Josh Riley, lawyer, aide to former U.S. Representative Maurice Hinchey, and general counsel to U.S. Senator Al Franken on the U.S. Senate Judiciary Committee (previously filed to run in the 22nd district)

Eliminated in primary 
Jamie Cheney, businesswoman

Declined 
Zephyr Teachout, special advisor in the office of the attorney general of New York (2022–present), Fordham University law professor, candidate for governor in 2014, nominee for New York's 19th congressional district in 2016, candidate for attorney general in 2018, and candidate for attorney general in 2022
Michelle Hinchey, member of the New York State Senate from the 46th district (2021–present) (running for reelection)

Withdrawn 
Antonio Delgado, resigned as U.S. Representative to become Lieutenant Governor

Endorsements

Primary results

Republican nominee
Marc Molinaro, Dutchess County executive and nominee for Governor of New York in 2018

Disqualified 
Brandon Buccola

Withdrew 
Kyle Van De Water, Republican nominee for this district in 2020

Endorsements

General election

Predictions

Polling

Results

District 20

The 20th district is based in the Capital Region, including Albany, Troy, Schenectady, and Saratoga Springs. It includes all of Albany, Schenectady, and Saratoga counties and parts of Rensselaer County. Due to redistricting, the district lost Amsterdam to the 21st district. It has a PVI of D+7 and voted for Joe Biden by 20 points in 2020. The incumbent is Democrat Paul Tonko, who was reelected with 61.2% of the vote in 2020.

Democratic primary

Candidates

Nominee 
Paul Tonko, incumbent U.S. Representative

Elimated in primary
Rostov Rar

Disqualified
Justin Raphael Chaires
Cole Francis Matthews
Jack Fallon-Underwood, musician

Endorsements

Primary results

Republican nominee
Liz Joy, Republican nominee for this district in 2020

Endorsements

General election

Predictions

Results

District 21

The 21st district is based in the North Country and Adirondack Mountains, including Glens Falls, Lake George, Plattsburgh, Potsdam, Amsterdam, and Cooperstown. Redistricting added parts of the Mohawk Valley to the district while removing Watertown. The district has a PVI of R+9 and voted for Donald Trump by 12 points in 2020. The incumbent is Republican Elise Stefanik, who was reelected with 58.8% of the vote in 2020.

Republican nominee
Elise Stefanik, incumbent U.S. Representative and Chair of the House Republican Conference

Withdrew 
Lonny William Koons, former paratrooper and truck driver

Endorsements

Democratic primary

Candidates

Nominee 
Matt Castelli, former CIA officer

Eliminated in primary
Matt Putorti, attorney

Did not make the ballot 
Ezra Watson

Withdrew
Brigid "Bridie" Farrell, child victims advocate and former speedskater

Endorsements

Primary results

General election

Predictions

Results

District 22

The 22nd district is based in Central New York and the Mohawk Valley, including Syracuse and Utica. It includes all of Onondaga, Oneida, and Madison Counties and a small sliver of Oswego County. The district was significantly altered by redistricting, losing all of its previous territory in the Southern Tier while adding Syracuse. The district has a PVI of D+1 and voted for Joe Biden by 8 points in 2020, similar to the partisanship of the old 24th district. The incumbent is Republican John Katko of the 24th district, who was elected with 53.1% of the vote in 2020. Katko is retiring.

Republican primary

Nominee 
Brandon Williams, U.S. Navy veteran

Eliminated in primary 
Steve Wells, former prosecutor

Withdrawn 
Timothy Ko, physician assistant (endorsed Sigler)
Mike Sigler, Tompkins County legislator (filed to run in the 23rd district, then withdrew) (endorsed Wells)

Declined 
Claudia Tenney, incumbent U.S. Representative (previously filed to run in the 23rd district, now running in the 24th district)
John Katko, incumbent U.S. Representative
J. Ryan McMahon II, Onondaga County Executive

Endorsements

Primary results

Democratic primary

Nominee 
Francis Conole, commander in U.S. Navy Reserves and candidate for NY-24 in 2020

Eliminated in primary 
Sarah Hood, U.S. Air Force veteran and economic developer
Chol Majok, Syracuse City Councilor
Samuel D. Roberts, former New York State Assemblyman

Withdrawn 
Vanessa Fajans-Turner, climate change activist

Polling

Endorsements

Primary results

General election

Predictions

Polling

Generic Republican vs. generic Democrat

Results

District 23

District 23 is based in the Southern Tier and Western New York, including Elmira, Corning, Jamestown, and outer Erie County. Due to redistricting, the district lost parts of the Finger Lakes such as Ithaca while picking up parts of Erie County formerly in the 27th district. The district has a PVI of R+12 and voted for Donald Trump by 17 points in 2020. The district's two incumbents, both Republicans, both declined to run for reelection: Joe Sempolinski, who was elected in August 2022 to fulfill the remaining term caused by Tom Reed's resignation, specifically ran for the seat as a placeholder and not as a permanent representative; and Chris Jacobs, of the old 27th district, announced that he would no longer seek election to the seat after his comments in support of gun control in the wake of the Robb Elementary School shooting upset many other Republicans and drew threats of primary challengers.

Republican primary

Nominee 
Nick Langworthy, chair of the New York Republican Party (2019–present)

Eliminated in primary 
Carl Paladino, businessman, former Buffalo school board member (2013–2017), and nominee for Governor in 2010

Disqualified 
Rich Moon, pharmacist (Moon is continuing as a write-in candidate)

Withdrawn 
Marc Cenedella, CEO of Ladders, Inc.
Chris Jacobs, incumbent representative of New York's 27th congressional district (the 27th district was eliminated following the 2020 Census) (previously filed to run in the 24th district)
Joe Sempolinski, incumbent U.S. Representative from the 23rd district
Mike Sigler, Tompkins County Legislator (previously filed to run in the 22nd district)
Claudia Tenney, incumbent U.S. Representative for New York's 22nd congressional district (running in the 24th district)

Declined 
Tom Reed, incumbent U.S. Representative (2010–2022)
Catharine Young, former member of the New York State Senate for the 57th district
Christopher Moss, Chemung County executive

Endorsements

Polling

Primary results

Democratic nominee
Max Della Pia, U.S. Air Force veteran, candidate in 2018, and nominee for this seat in the special election

Declined 
Anthony Brindisi, former U.S. Representative for New York's 22nd congressional district (2019–2021)
Tracy Mitrano, Democratic nominee for this district in 2018 and 2020

General election

Predictions

Results

District 24

The 24th district is based along the Lake Ontario coast (minus Rochester) and the upper Finger Lakes, including Watertown, Oswego, Auburn, Seneca Falls, and Batavia. It was significantly altered by redistricting, taking in all of the old 27th district outside of Erie County while only retaining the rural parts of the old 24th district. The district has a PVI of R+12 and voted for Donald Trump by 17 points in 2020. Republican Claudia Tenney, the incumbent of the old 22nd district, is moving to this district. She was narrowly elected with 47.8% of the vote in 2020.

Republican primary

Nominee
 Claudia Tenney, incumbent U.S. Representative for New York's 22nd congressional district (previously filed to run in the 23rd district)

Eliminated in primary 
Mario Fratto, attorney and businessman
George K. Phillips

Withdrawn
Todd Aldinger, attorney (endorsed McCarthy)
Chris Jacobs, incumbent representative of New York's 27th congressional district (the 27th district was eliminated following the 2020 Census) (announced run in the 23rd district, then withdrew)
Andrew McCarthy, intelligence analyst
John Murtari, software engineer and former U.S. Air Force pilot

Endorsements

Polling

Primary results

Democratic nominee
Steven Holden, veteran and businessman

General election

Predictions

Results

District 25

The 25th district is based in the Rochester area, including all of Monroe County and most of Orleans County. The district was mostly unchanged by redistricting. It has a PVI of D+7 and voted for Joe Biden by 21 points in 2020. The incumbent is Democrat Joseph Morelle, who was reelected with 59.3% of the vote in 2020.

Democratic nominee
Joseph Morelle, incumbent U.S. Representative

Republican nominee
La'Ron Singletary, former Rochester police chief

Predictions

Polling

Results

District 26

The 26th district is based in the Buffalo-Niagara Falls area, including the more urban parts of Erie County and western Niagara County. The district was mostly unchanged by redistricting. It has a PVI of D+8 and voted for Joe Biden by 26 points in 2020. The incumbent is Democrat Brian Higgins, who was reelected with 69.8% of the vote in 2020.

Democratic primary

Candidates

Nominee 
Brian Higgins, incumbent U.S. Representative

Eliminated in primary
Emin "Eddie" Egriu, contractor

Primary results

Republican nominee
Steven L. Sams II, Afghanistan and Iraq veteran

General election

Predictions

Endorsements

Results

Notes 

Partisan clients

References

External links
 New York State Board of Elections

2022
New York
United States House of Representatives